A. crocea may refer to:

 Alstroemeria crocea, a flowering plant
 Amanita crocea, an edible fungus
 Aphaenogaster crocea, a myrmicine ant
 Aptilosia crocea, a moth first described in 1911
 Atheropla crocea, a concealer moth